Chelsea Blaine Stewart (born April 28, 1990) is a Canadian former soccer player who played as a defender for the Canada women's national soccer team.

Personal
Stewart was born in Denver, Colorado to a Canadian father and an Italian mother (from Naples). She was raised in Denver and The Pas, Manitoba, her father's homeland. She comes from a family of sport. Her father and brother both played ice hockey while her sister is also a soccer player. She was raised in Abbotsford, British Columbia.

Youth career
Stewart attended Vanderbilt University her freshman year and scored 3 goals in 18 games for the Commodores. She then transferred to UCLA, and after sitting out a year because of national team commitments, scored 2 goals in 66 games for the Bruins.

Club career
In January 2014, the Canadian women's national team allocated Stewart to the Boston Breakers of the National Women's Soccer League (NWSL). She signed on loan for Japanese club INAC Kobe Leonessa in October 2014. In 2015, Stewart returned to the NWSL after the Western New York Flash signed her as a Discovery Player. Stewart was waived by the Flash on July 22, 2015. Stewart signed for Bundesliga club SC Freiburg on August 8, 2016.

International career
Stewart has represented Canada on the U-20 youth as well as participating in the 2011 FIFA Women's World Cup. When the Canadian team that competed in the 2012 Olympics defeated France 1–0 on August 9, 2012 in the bronze medal match, Stewart was awarded a medal since she had played in four of the matches for Canada.

References

External links 

1990 births
Living people
Citizens of Canada through descent
Soccer people from Manitoba
Canadian expatriate women's soccer players
Canadian women's soccer players
Canada women's international soccer players
Women's association football midfielders
People from The Pas
2011 FIFA Women's World Cup players
Vancouver Whitecaps FC (women) players
USL W-League (1995–2015) players
Footballers at the 2012 Summer Olympics
Olympic soccer players of Canada
Olympic medalists in football
Olympic bronze medalists for Canada
Medalists at the 2012 Summer Olympics
Soccer players from Denver
People from Highlands Ranch, Colorado
UCLA Bruins women's soccer players
INAC Kobe Leonessa players
Nadeshiko League players
Canadian expatriate sportspeople in Japan
Expatriate women's footballers in Japan
Canadian expatriate sportspeople in Germany
Expatriate women's footballers in Germany
SC Freiburg (women) players
Vanderbilt Commodores women's soccer players
Western New York Flash players
National Women's Soccer League players
Boston Breakers players
American people of Canadian descent
Canadian people of Italian descent
American people of Italian descent
American women's soccer players